The 2019–20 Montenegrin Cup was the 14th season of the knockout football tournament in Montenegro. The cup began on 28 August 2019, but wasn't finished due to the coronavirus pandemic. 

Budućnost were the defending champions from the previous season after defeating Lovćen in the final by the score of 4–0.

First round
Draw for the first round was held on 22 August 2019. Ten first round matches were played on 28 August 2019 and one was played on 25 September 2019.

Summary

|}

Matches

Second round
Draw for the second round was held on 26 September 2019, Jedinstvo received a bye. After the draw, Petnjica withdrew from the competition. Twelve clubs competed in the second round which was played over two legs from 2 to 23 October 2019.

Summary

|}

First legs

Second legs

Quarter-finals
Draw for the quarter-finals was held on 31 October 2019. The quarter-finals were played over two legs from 6 November 2019 to 15 December 2019.

Summary

|}

First legs

Second legs

Interruption
Montenegrin Cup was interrupted in March 2020, before the semi-finals, due to the coronavirus pandemic. Semifinalists were FK Budućnost, FK Sutjeska, FK Podgorica and OFK Petrovac. 
Three months after that, Football Association of Montenegro decided that Montenegrin Cup for the season 2019-20 won't be continued, as all official competitions were suspended.

See also
 Montenegrin Cup
 Montenegrin First League

References

External links
Montenegrin Cup 2019-2020 at Football Association of Montenegro's official site
Montenegrin Cup 2019-2020 at Soccerway

Montenegrin Cup seasons
Montenegro
Cup
Montenegro